Lakeside Dwelling (Habitation lacustre) is a 1878 oil painting by Emmanuel Benner (1836-1896). It is now in the Musée des Beaux-Arts de Mulhouse. Its inventory number is D.62.1.23.

The painting was displayed at the 1878 Paris Salon under the more specific title Une famille lacustre, au lac de Bienne (Suisse), i. e. A Family of Lake Dwellers, by Lake Biel (Switzerland). It is one of several Prehistory-themed paintings made by Benner. Discoveries made around Lake Zurich in 1854 had popularized the (now discredited) scientific image of ancient populations living in stilt houses built on Swiss lakes. In reality, these populations mostly lived on the shores.

References 

Paintings in Alsace
1878 paintings
Oil on canvas paintings
History paintings
French paintings